The University of Santo Tomas Central Seminary Building currently houses the Santísimo Rosario Parish, the Central Seminary, and the Faculties of Ecclesiastical Studies of the Pontifical and Royal University of Santo Tomas in Manila. The Parish was canonically inaugurated on April 26, 1942 by Michael J. O'Doherty, the Archbishop of Manila. On January 25, 2010, the National Museum of the Philippines formally declared the Central Seminary Building as a National Cultural Treasure.

Architecture 

The Central Seminary of the University of Santo Tomas was designed by Ar. Fernando Hizon Ocampo Sr. It was built in the 1930s. The plan of the seminary was configured in the form of the letter E, with courtyards bisecting the wings. The boxy building had an elongated frontage assembling a continuous band of balconies and windows on the second and third level. The structure's horizontally-oriented massing was broken by an engaged central section at the main entrance and two other similar treatments at the end portions. An art deco relief, bud-like finials, and a tableau embellished the stepped pylon at the entrance.

Official Declaration
Section 3 of “The Cultural Properties Preservation and Protection Act” states that a “National Cultural Treasure is a unique object found locally, possessing outstanding historical, cultural, artistic and/or scientific value which is significant and important to this country and nation.” This prestigious recognition marks the first ever inclusion of an educational institution among the ranks of National Cultural Treasures, with the majority of structures being churches and the rest being terrestrial landmarks, intangible cultural property and movable objects.” As heritage sites, they will be accorded protection and recognition, giving importance to their witness of 400 years of tumultuous Philippine history.

Gallery

References

External links
Website of Central Seminary

Central Seminary Building
Buildings and structures in Sampaloc, Manila
Educational structures in Metro Manila
Art Deco architecture in the Philippines